Sukhi Dam is an embankment dam on the Sukhi River near the village of Dungarvat in Vadodara district of Gujarat, India. It was built between 1978 and 1987. The dam is an earth-fill type with a masonry spillway section.

References

Dams in Gujarat
Earth-filled dams
Dams completed in 1987
1987 establishments in Gujarat
Buildings and structures in Vadodara
20th-century architecture in India